The 1939 Boston College Eagles football team represented Boston College during the 1939 college football season. The Eagles were led by first-year head coach Frank Leahy and played their home games at Alumni Field in Chestnut Hill, Massachusetts and Fenway Park in Boston. The team finished the regular season with a 9–1 record, and the Eagles were ranked in the final AP Poll for the first time in school history, at 11th. They were invited to the school's first bowl game, the 1940 Cotton Bowl, where they were defeated by Clemson.

Schedule

References

Boston College
Boston College Eagles football seasons
Boston College Eagles football
1930s in Boston